D. Rogers is an Australian musician based in Melbourne. He was a member of Klinger until he left in 2003 and moved to Japan. While in Japan, working as an English teacher, he recorded two albums, the first being a friends-only release. He returned to Australia in 2007 and recorded a third solo album.

Discography
The 14th Turn (2004)
'Neath The Dark of Fuses Blown (2006)
Sparks on the Tarmac (2007) – Popboomerang Records
Natural Disasters (2010) – Popboomerang Records
Kicking The Tracers (2013) – Crying Ninja Records
An Undefined Number (2013) – Crying Ninja Records

Production Credits 

 Slow Fades, Canyon Songs (EP, 2018)
The Glorious North, Welcome to the Glorious North (Album, 2016)
The Glorious North, Dang! (EP, 2015)
The Glorious North, At the Bar with the Glorious North (EP, 2017)
Tali, Cavewoman (Single, 2017)
Second Prize, The Heel Turn (EP, 2018)
The Barebones, Where Have All the Good Folk Gone? (Album, 2015)

References

External links
D. Rogers website

Australian male singers
Australian songwriters
Living people
Year of birth missing (living people)